Lee Creek, Lee's Creek and Lees Creek may refer to:

Streams
In the United States
Lee Creek (Arkansas), a creek in Arkansas and Oklahoma
Lee Creek (Nevada), a stream in Nevada
Lees Creek (Ohio), a creek in Ohio
Lees Creek (Lackawanna River), in Lackawanna County, Pennsylvania
historical name of Nanticoke Creek, Pennsylvania
Lee Creek (Ohio River), a stream in West Virginia

Elsewhere
Lee Creek (New South Wales), a creek in Australia

Populated places
In the United States
Lee Creek, Arkansas, an unincorporated community
Lee's Creek Township, Washington County, Arkansas
Lees Creek, Ohio, an unincorporated community
Lee Creek, West Virginia, an unincorporated community

Other
Lee Creek Bridge (disambiguation)
Lee's Creek Covered Bridge, near Dover, Kentucky, USA
Lee Creek Snowshoe Cabin, in Glacier National Park, Montana, USA